Aashirwad is a Hindi television serial that aired on Zee TV from 19 June 1998 to 13 July 2001. The serial was based on story of two best friends who raise their children in different styles. The Show was produced by Manish Goswami.

Plot
The story is of two friends who raise their children in contrasting styles — one allowing them all possible liberties and the other keeping a strict hold on them. It explores a central theme of parenting — whether leniency in upbringing of children is justified or not — and traces the consequent pros and cons as the children mature into adults.

Cast 
 Govind Namdev as Purushottam Choudhary
 Navin Nischol as Mr. Deshmukh
 Nasir Khan as Subhash Choudhary 
 Poonam Narula as Amita Deshmukh
 Sanjeev Seth as Vijay Mansingha
 Anju Mahendru as Sumitra Devi
 Manasi Salvi as Preeti Choudhary / Preeti Vijay Mansingha
 Kavita Kapoor as Radha Deshmukh
 Shama Deshpande as Aparna Purushottam Choudhary
 Randeep Singh as Radheyshyam Choudhary 
 Sandhya Mridul as Geeta Radheyshyam Choudhary
 Bharat Kapoor as Mr. Choudhary
 Rajendra Gupta as Mr. Mittal
 Sonali Malhotra as Roma Mittal
 Nandita Puri as Vandana
 Hussain Kuwajerwala as Dinesh
 Smita Bansal as Vishakha
 Delnaaz Irani as Babli
 Sheetal Thakkar as Deepali
 Shishir Sharma

External links
Official website at Siddhant Cinevision
Official site on Zee Syndication

Indian television soap operas
Zee TV original programming
1998 Indian television series debuts
1999 Indian television series endings